Irina Konstantinovna Khlebko (born 30 November 1990) is a Russian badminton player.

Achievements

BWF Grand Prix 
The BWF Grand Prix has two level such as Grand Prix and Grand Prix Gold. It is a series of badminton tournaments, sanctioned by Badminton World Federation (BWF) since 2007.

Women's doubles

 BWF Grand Prix Gold tournament
 BWF Grand Prix tournament

BWF International Challenge/Series
Women's doubles

Mixed doubles

 BWF International Challenge tournament
 BWF International Series tournament
 BWF Future Series tournament

References

External links
 
 
 infosport.ru ХЛЕБКО Ирина Константиновна

1990 births
Living people
Russian female badminton players
21st-century Russian women